Rote Raben Vilsbiburg (Red Ravens) is a German women's volleyball team based in Vilsbiburg, Bavaria. The team competes in the Bundesliga, and has been national champion two times (2008, 2010) and DVV-Pokal cup winner two times (2009, 2014).

References

External links

German volleyball clubs
Sport in Bavaria
Women's volleyball in Germany
Landshut
Volleyball clubs established in 1971
1971 establishments in West Germany